Grigny may refer to:

People
 Nicolas de Grigny (1672–1703), French Baroque organist and composer

Places

Grigny is the name or part of the name of several communes in France:

 Grigny, Pas-de-Calais
 Grigny, Metropolis of Lyon
 Grigny, Essonne